Ludwig II, King of Bavaria is a 1929 German silent historical film directed by William Dieterle and starring Dieterle, Theodor Loos and Eugen Burg. It portrays the life and reign of the monarch Ludwig II who ruled Bavaria from 1864 to 1886. It was made at the Bavaria Studios in Geiselgasteig, Munich. The production company was the German subsidiary of the American studio Universal Pictures.

Cast

References

Bibliography

External links

1930 films
1930s historical drama films
German historical drama films
Films of the Weimar Republic
1930s German-language films
German silent feature films
1930s biographical drama films
German biographical drama films
Films directed by William Dieterle
Biographical films about German royalty
Biographical films about Austrian royalty
Films set in Bavaria
Films set in the 1860s
Films set in the 1870s
Films set in the 1880s
Films set in castles
Universal Pictures films
Films produced by Joe Pasternak
Cultural depictions of Ludwig II of Bavaria
Cultural depictions of Empress Elisabeth of Austria
German black-and-white films
1930 drama films
Films set in the Kingdom of Bavaria
Silent historical drama films
1930s German films
Films shot at Bavaria Studios